The men's 58 kg  competition in taekwondo at the 2000 Summer Olympics in Sydney took place on September 28 at the State Sports Centre.

American taekwondo jin Steven López came from behind in the final round to dedeat South Korea's Sin Joon-sik for the gold medal in the men's featherweight class. Meanwhile, Iranian fighter Hadi Saei edged his Turkish-born Austrian opponent Tuncay Çalışkan 4–2 to earn a bronze.

Competition format
The main bracket consisted of a single elimination tournament, culminating in the gold medal match. The taekwondo fighters eliminated in earlier rounds by the two finalists of the main bracket advanced directly to the repechage tournament. These matches determined the bronze medal winner for the event.

Schedule
All times are Greece Standard Time (UTC+2)

Competitors

Results
Legend
KO — Won by knockout
PTG — Won by points gap
SUP — Won by superiority
OT — Won on over time (Golden Point)
WO — Walkover

Main bracket

Repechage

References

External links
Official Report

Men's 068 kg
Men's events at the 2000 Summer Olympics